Lou Jeanmonnot (born 28 October 1998) is a French biathlete. She competes in the Biathlon World Cup.

Biathlon results 
All results are sourced from the International Biathlon Union.

World Championships

World Cup
World Cup rankings

Relay victories
3 victories

References

External links

1998 births
Living people
French female biathletes
People from Pontarlier
21st-century French women